Abdullah İçel (also known as Abdoullah Icel in Belgium) (born January 12, 1982) is a Turkish-Belgian futsal player.  He currently plays and previously played for Alliance Ecaussines, Arenberg FC Enghien, Newpers Anderlues and Paraske Bowl Morlanwelz.

He is a member of the Turkey national futsal team in the UEFA Futsal Championship.

References

External links 
 Profile at futsalteam.com

1982 births
Living people
Turkish men's futsal players
Belgian people of Turkish descent